The 1st Marine Regiment is an infantry regiment of the United States Marine Corps based at Marine Corps Base Camp Pendleton, California. The regiment is under the command of the 1st Marine Division and the I Marine Expeditionary Force. The 1st Marine Regiment is also sometimes referred to as "Regimental Combat Team 1" or "Inchon".

Subordinate units
The regiment comprises four infantry battalions and one headquarters company:

 Headquarters Company 1st Marines 
 1st Battalion, 1st Marines (1/1)
 2nd Battalion, 1st Marines (2/1)
 3rd Battalion, 1st Marines (3/1)
 1st Battalion, 4th Marines (1/4) – (1/4 is assigned to the 1st Marine Regiment for the purpose of facilitating 4th Marines as a "host" regimental headquarters for battalions on unit deployment program assignments to 3rd Marine Division on Okinawa.)

History
The 1st Marines were activated in Philadelphia, Pennsylvania on 27 November 1913. At this time, it bore the designation of 2nd Advanced Base Regiment. During the 1st Marine Regiment's early years, it was primarily employed as a combat force in the so-called Banana Wars, and in the Caribbean area. The first of these engagements occurred in April 1914, when the regiment landed and seized the Mexican port of Vera Cruz.

They next participated in the Haitian campaign (1915–1916) and the Dominican Republic campaign (1916). On 1 July 1916, this organization was re-designated as the 1st Regiment of Marines. In December 1918, the 1st Regiment returned to the Caribbean and was deployed to Cuba for approximately six months.

Following its second Dominican tour of duty, it was deactivated; but it was subsequently reactivated at Quantico, Virginia on 15 March 1925. The Regiment received its present designation of 1st Marines on 10 July 1930. The 1930s was a period of inactivity in the 1st Marines' history, as the unit was in a deactivated status during most of this time. World War II was the occasion for the next reactivation of the Regiment on 1 February 1941 at Culebra, Puerto Rico as part of the 1st Marine Division.

World War II
The 1st Marines stood at a low state of readiness at the beginning of the war, having just been reconstituted from cadre status; however, the regiment did possess very strong leadership at the higher levels. In June 1942, the 1st Marines set sail from San Francisco on board a mix of eight ships headed for the South Pacific. The 1st Marines landed on the island of Guadalcanal, part of the Solomon Islands, on August 7, 1942 and fought in the Guadalcanal Campaign until relieved on 22 December 1942.

Some of the heaviest action the regiment saw on Guadalcanal took place on August 21, 1942 during the Battle of the Tenaru, which was the first Japanese counter-attack of the campaign. Following their first campaign, the regiment was sent to Melbourne, Australia to rest and refit. During their stay, there they were billeted in the Melbourne Cricket Ground until leaving in September 1943.

The 1st Marines' next action was Operation Cartwheel, which was the codename for the campaigns in Eastern New Guinea and New Britain. The regiment was the first ashore at the Battle of Cape Gloucester on December 26, 1943; and continued fighting on the island, at such places as Suicide Creek and Ajar Ridge, until February 1944.

The 1st Marines next battle was its bloodiest yet – the Battle of Peleliu. The regiment landed on September 15, 1944 as part of the 1st Marine Division's assault on the island. The division's commanding general, Major General William H. Rupertus had predicted the fighting would be, "...tough but short. It'll be over in three of four days – a fight like Tarawa. Rough but fast. Then we can go back to a rest area.".During the Battle of Peleliu, the regiment was decimated by heavy artillery and accurate small arms fire in the vicinity of Bloody Nose Ridge. Repeated frontal assaults with fixed bayonets failed to unseat the Japanese defenders from the 14th Division (Imperial Japanese Army). The 1st Marines fought on Peleliu for 10 days before being pulled off the lines after suffering 58% casualties and no longer being combat effective.  Ten days of fighting on Peleliu cost the 1st Marine Regiment 1,749 casualties.

The last World War II engagement for the regiment was the Battle of Okinawa under the command of Colonel Arthur T. Mason.

In September 1945, the 1st Marines deployed to North China to take part in the garrisoning of the area and in the repatriation of former enemy personnel. It remained in China until February 1949. It is also likely that they were stationed in North China to bolster the Chinese Nationalists defense against the Chinese Communists. The presence of the 1st Marines was used as leverage by George C. Marshall in 1945–46 to attempt to moderate a settlement to the impending Chinese Civil War. The regiment returned to Marine Corps Base Camp Pendleton and was deactivated on October 1, 1949.

Korean War

The Korean War prompted an expansion of the Marine Corps. As a result, the regiment was brought back into existence on 4 August 1950. On 15 September, the 1st Marine Division, including the 1st Marines, assaulted the beaches of Inchon.

The regiment then went on to take part in the liberation of Seoul and later in the Chosin Reservoir Campaign. For the next two and one-half years, the 1st Marines continued to engage the North Koreans and Chinese Communists. Following the termination of hostilities in July 1953, the Regiment remained in Korea and acted as a defensive force against possible Communist attempts to rekindle the war. The 1st Marines returned to Camp Pendleton in April 1955. There it stayed for the following ten years, except for a brief deployment to Guantanamo Bay, Cuba and the Caribbean during the 1962 Cuban Missile Crisis.

Vietnam War

With the intensification of the American involvement in the war in Vietnam in 1965, the 1st Marine Regiment was quickly deployed to the region. By January 1966, the entire regiment had completed its move to Vietnam. The first major operation in the war for a battalion of the 1st Marines was Operation Harvest Moon in December 1965.

By fall of 1967, the 1st Marines were operating permanently in the northern sector of the I Corps tactical zone. The following winter the communists launched their all-out Tet Offensive. The enemy overran Hue, the old imperial capital. Between 31 January and 2 March 1968, elements of the 1st Marines, commanded by Col. Stanley Hughes, along with other U.S. Marine and South Vietnamese units, fought to regain control of the city. Bitter street fighting and hand-to-hand combat characterized the battle. Hue was finally recaptured after the enemy suffered nearly 1,900 killed. The regiment remained deployed in South Vietnam for the next two and a half years, participating in numerous operations, both large and small. On 28 June 1971, the last members of the regiment departed Da Nang to return to the United States at MCB Camp Pendleton. The 1st Marines were the last marine infantry unit to depart Vietnam.

Post Vietnam era

In the spring of 1975, the 1st Marines provided primary support to the Marine Corps Base at Camp Pendleton for preparation of a camp to house Vietnamese refugees during Operation New Arrivals. In 1983, 1st Marines were assigned responsibility to provide the Ground Combat Element for the WESTPAC MAU. Since the inception of the special operations capable (SOC) marine expeditionary units (MEUs) in support of contingency operations in the Western Pacific, the 1st Marine Regiment has been the SOC regiment of the 1st Marine Division.

Operation Desert Storm and LA riots
In August 1990, Iraq invaded Kuwait and 1st Marines deployed in support of Operation Desert Shield. On 30 December 1990, 1st Marines was designated as Task Force Papa Bear. The task force attacked into Kuwait on 23 February and continued its march to the vicinity of Kuwait International Airport, where hostilities ceased on 27 February.

From 1 to 11 May 1992, elements of the regiment deployed to perform riot control operations as part of the Joint Special Purpose Marine Air Ground Task Force Los Angeles. They assumed a prominent role in quelling the urban unrest in South Central Los Angeles.

Operation Iraqi Freedom

In January 2003, 1st Marines deployed for Operation Iraqi Freedom. Organized as a 5,000-man combined arms task force, known as Regimental Combat Team One (RCT-1), the regiment fought its way from Kuwait to Baghdad, with significant actions at An Nasariyah, Al Kut, and Baghdad. On 5 April, commanding officer Colonel Joe D. Dowdy was relieved by Major General James Mattis and replaced by Colonel John Toolan, a highly unusual act. Subsequent to the collapse of the regime, the RCT conducted security and stability operations in Baghdad and Al Hillah until returning home throughout the summer of 2003.

In February 2004, 1st Marines deployed to the Al Anbar province of Iraq. Upon arrival in theater, 1st Marines formed into RCT-1 and conducted a relief-in-place with 3d Brigade of the 82d Airborne Division. RCT-1 consisted of several major subordinate commands from 1st Marine Division and various smaller attachments from throughout the Marine Corps.

The RCT's area of operation consisted of numerous cities, most important of which was Al Fallujah. On 31 March 2004, four U.S. citizens working for Blackwater USA were attacked, mutilated and hung on a bridge in the city. On 7 April 2004, Operation Vigilant Resolve commenced in response to these deaths. After intense urban fighting, a political resolution was mandated and the regiment was ordered out of the city.

Throughout September and October 2004, insurgent presence increased in Fallujah.
Led by the 1st Marine Division, Operation Phantom Fury began with an assault north of the city, with four infantry battalions in the attack. Designated the division main effort, RCT-1 (3rd Battalion, 1st Marines) crossed the line of departure on 7 November 2004. After twelve days of intense urban combat, 1st Marine Division had defeated the insurgents and successfully fought its way to the southern end of the city capturing the western half of Fallujah. First Marines returned to Camp Pendleton, California, in April 2005.

Unit awards
A unit citation or commendation is an award bestowed upon an organization for the action cited. Members of the unit who participated in said actions are allowed to wear on their uniforms the awarded unit citation. The 1st Marine Regiment has been presented with the following awards:

Medal of Honor recipients
Nineteen Marines from the 1st Marines have been awarded the Medal of Honor: 7 during World War II, 10 during the Korean War, and two during the Vietnam War.

See also

 List of United States Marine Corps regiments
 Organization of the United States Marine Corps

References

Sources

Notes

External links 

 

Infantry01
1st Marine
Military units and formations established in 1913
InfReg0001
Military units and formations of the United States Marine Corps in the Vietnam War
Military units and formations of the United States in the Gulf War
Infantry units and formations of the United States Marine Corps
1st Marine Division (United States)
1913 establishments in Pennsylvania